Guliakhali sea beach (also known as Muradpur beach) is located at Muradpur, Sitakunda in Chittagong Division, Bangladesh. It is 5 kilometres away from Sitakunda town.

Gulai

Gallery

See also
 Chandranath Temple

References

External links

Beaches of Bangladesh